This article describes some of the 2019 seasons of TCR Series across the world.

VLN TCR Class

The 2019 Veranstaltergemeinschaft Langstreckenpokal Nürburgring TCR Class was the third season for the TCR Class in the championship.

Teams and drivers

Some TCR cars come in other VLN classes.

Calendar and results

UAE Touring Car Championship 
The 2018–19 UAE Touring Car Championship (also called NGK UAE Touring Car Championship for sponsorship reasons) is the 11th season of the UAE Touring Car Championship and the first that TCR class was featured.

Teams and drivers 
All teams are UAE–registered.

Calendar and results 
All Rounds are held in the United Arab Emirates.

Championship standings

TCR Baltic Trophy 
The 2019 TCR Baltic Trophy will be the third season of TCR Baltic Trophy, which is contested within the Baltic Touring Car Championship events. There will be also a standalone endurance class, which is contested within the supporting NEZ Endurance Championship. The winner of TCR Baltic in 2019 was Džiugas Tovilavičius.

Teams and drivers

Calendar and results 

Scoring system

Championship standings 

† – Drivers did not finish the race, but were classified as they completed over 75% of the race distance.

TCR Ibérico Touring Car Series 
The 2019 TCR Ibérico Touring Car Series season was the third season of the TCR Ibérico Touring Car Series. The championship started at Circuito do Estoril in Portugal on 13 April and ended at Algarve International Circuit in Portugal on 26 October.

Calendar and results

Championship standings 

† – Drivers did not finish the race, but were classified as they completed over 75% of the race distance.

TCR Spa 500

FIA Motorsport Games Touring Car Cup

References

External links 
 
 
 

2019